Aqueducts (or water bridges) are bridges constructed to convey watercourses across gaps such as valleys or ravines. The term aqueduct may also be used to refer to the entire watercourse, as well as the bridge. Large navigable aqueducts are used as transport links for boats or ships. Aqueducts must span a crossing at the same level as the watercourses on each end. A modern version of an aqueduct is a pipeline bridge. They may take the form of tunnels, networks of surface channels and canals, covered clay pipes or monumental bridges.

Ancient bridges for water

Although particularly associated with the Romans, aqueducts were likely first used by the Minoans around 2000 BCE. The Minoans had developed what was then an extremely advanced irrigation system, including several aqueducts.

In the seventh century BCE, the Assyrians built an 80 km long limestone aqueduct, which included a 10 m high section to cross a 300 m wide valley, to carry water to their capital city, Nineveh.

Roman Empire

Bridges were a distinctive feature of Roman aqueducts, which were built in all parts of the Roman Empire, from Germany to Africa, and especially in the city of Rome, where they supplied water to public baths and for drinking. Roman aqueducts set a standard of engineering that was not surpassed for more than a thousand years.

Modern aqueducts

Navigable aqueducts

Navigable aqueducts, also called water bridges, are water-filled bridges to allow vessels on a waterway to cross ravines or valleys. During the Industrial Revolution of the 18th century, navigable aqueducts were constructed as part of the boom in canal-building. A notable revolving aqueduct has been made on the Bridgewater Canal. This allowed vessels to cross at high and low levels while conserving water that would be lost in the operation of locks.

Notable aqueducts

Roman aqueducts

The Pont du Gard in southern France
Barbegal aqueduct, France
Aqueduto de São Sebastião, in Coimbra, Portugal
Eifel aqueduct, Germany
Caesarea Maritima, Israel
Patras, Greece
Aqueduct of Segovia, Spain
Acueducto de los Milagros, Mérida, Spain
Tarragona, Spain
Almuñécar, Spain (5 aqueducts – 4 still in use)
Valens Aqueduct, Istanbul, Turkey
Aqua Augusta, Italy
Aqua Claudia and the Anio Novus, as part of the Porta Maggiore, Rome, Italy
Skopje Aqueduct, Skopje, North Macedonia

Other aqueducts

Wignacourt Aqueduct, Malta; built in the 17th century to transport water from Dingli and Rabat to the new capital city Valletta; today, most of its arches still survive in the localities of Attard, Balzan, Birkirkara, Fleur-de-Lys and Santa Venera
Tabarja, aqueduct runs throughout the entire ancient town and is still actively used by the farmers of the area (built 1700–1750)
Aqueduct St-Clément, Montpellier, France – 17th century
Bar Aqueduct, Montenegro – 16th century
Aqueduto da Amoreira, in Elvas, Portugal (built 1537–1620)
Águas Livres Aqueduct, in Lisbon, Portugal (built 1731–1748)
Aqueduto de Óbidos, in Óbidos, Portugal (built 1570)
Aqueduto de Setúbal in Setúbal, Portugal (built 1696)
Aqueduto dos Pegões in Tomar, Portugal (built 1593)
Água de Prata Aqueduct, in Évora, Portugal (built 1531–1537)
Santa Clara Aqueduct, in Vila do Conde, Portugal
Carioca Aqueduct in Rio de Janeiro, Brazil (built 1744–1750)
Aqueduct of Teruel, Spain
Roquefavour aqueduct, France – built between 1842 and 1847
Greater Winnipeg Water District Aqueduct, Manitoba, Canada – built between 1915 and 1919
Mathur Aqueduct in Tamil Nadu state, India
 Surviving Spanish aqueducts in Mexico:
Aqueduct of Zacatecas, Zacatecas.
Aqueduct of Padre Tembleque, Zempoala, Hidalgo Mexico – built between 1553 and 1570
Aqueduct of Morelia, Michoacán, built between 1735 and 1738
Aqueduct of Los Remedios, Naucalpan, Mexico, 1765
Aqueduct of Acámbaro, Guanajuato, built in 1528
Chapultepec aqueduct, Mexico City
Aqueduct of Guadalupe, Mexico City – present-day only partially preserved due Modern avenues works
Kavala aqueduct, 16th-century Ottoman aqueduct in Kavala, Greece
High Bridge, part of the former Croton Aqueduct, built in 1848, is the oldest surviving bridge in New York City
Rostokino Aqueduct in Moscow, Russia (built 1780–1804)
Boothtown Aqueduct in Sydney, Australia (built 1886–1888)
Aqueduct of Bogotá, Colombia, built in 1955, notable by being the most modern aqueduct of Latin America in the 20th century.

Gallery

See also

Ancient Roman architecture
List of aqueducts
List of canal aqueducts in the United Kingdom
List of Roman aqueduct bridges
Pipeline – some used to carry water
Roman engineering
Water resources

Notes

References

Sextus Julius Frontinus, De Aquaeductu Urbis Romae (On the water management of the city of Rome), Translated by R. H. Rodgers, 2003, University of Vermont
Chanson, H. (2002). Certains Aspects de la Conception hydrauliques des Aqueducs Romains. ('Some Aspect on the Hydraulic Design of Roman Aqueducts.') Journal La Houille Blanche, No. 6/7, pp. 43–57 (ISSN 0018-6368)
Chanson, H. (2008). "The Hydraulics of Roman Aqueducts: What do we know? Why should we learn?" in Proceedings of World Environmental and Water Resources Congress 2008 Ahupua'a, ASCE-EWRI Education, Research and History Symposium, Hawaii, USA, Invited Keynote lecture, 13–16 May, R.W. Badcock Jr and R. Walton Eds., 16 pages

External links

Imperial Rome Water Systems
600 Roman aqueducts with 25 descriptions in detail
worldhistory.org
http://britannica.com/technology/aqueduct-engineering
 

 
Water
Bridges by mode of traffic
Water transport infrastructure
Water supply
Ancient inventions